Dustin Molicki (born 13 August 1975) is a Canadian speed skater. He competed in three events at the 2002 Winter Olympics.

References

External links
 

1975 births
Living people
Canadian male speed skaters
Olympic speed skaters of Canada
Speed skaters at the 2002 Winter Olympics
Speed skaters from Calgary
21st-century Canadian people